RIBO can stand for:
 Rotamah Island Bird Observatory

Ribo is the nickname of football player Rivaldo

ribo- is a combining form referring to the sugar ribose or some compound with a ribose component, including:
 ribonucleic acid (RNA)
 riboflavin = vitamin B2